Meedhuizen is a village in the Dutch province of Groningen. It is a part of the municipality of Eemsdelta, and lies about 24 km east of Groningen.

History 
The village was first mentioned in 1306 as Methuisen, and means "middle houses". Meedhuizen originates from the 13th century.

The Dutch Reformed church could date from the 13th century, but has extensively modified in 1703. In 1803, the tower was added and slightly enlarged in 1833.

Meedhuizen was home to 164 people in 1840. The village used to be located between three lakes: Meedhuizermeer, Farmsumermeer and the Proostmeer which were poldered between 1870 and 1900.

Gallery

References

External links 

Populated places in Groningen (province)
Eemsdelta